Bucyrus Township may refer to the following townships in the United States:

 Bucyrus Township, Adams County, North Dakota
 Bucyrus Township, Crawford County, Ohio